The Rocking Chair Ranche was a ranch located at North Elm Creek in Collingsworth County, Texas from 1883 to 1896.

History
The  Rocking Chair Ranche was bought by The 1st Baron Tweedmouth in 1883. After his death in 1894, it was owned by his son and heir, The 2nd Baron Tweedmouth, and the 1st Baron's son-in-law, The 7th Earl of Aberdeen.

The ranch was sold to the Continental Land and Cattle Company in December 1896.

Owners
The Hon. Archibald John Marjoribanks, the youngest son of The 1st Baron Tweedmouth, was sent to Texas to work as the assistant ranch manager and bookkeeper.  Archibald was not paid by the ranch but his father gave him a living allowance of £400 a year. Lord and Lady Aberdeen visited Archibald in the summer of 1887 and found him living in a one-bedroom wood frame house which he shared with the ranch manager, J. John Drew. During their stay, the Aberdeens slept in the bedroom while Archibald and the ranch manager slept on the terrace.  The closest township to the ranch was renamed Aberdeen after their visit at the suggestion of Archibald Marjoribanks.

Archibald became engaged to Elizabeth (known locally as "Myssie") Brown, of Nashville, Tennessee, daughter of Judge Trimble Brown, to the disapproval of Archibald's sister, Lady Aberdeen, who regarded Nashville ladies as frivolous and empty-headed compared to sober and industrious Scottish girls. Nevertheless, Archibald and Elizabeth were married and, after the ranch failed, moved to Bath in Somerset, England, where they had two children. After Archibald's death in 1900, Elizabeth married Archibald's cousin Douglas Hogg, who later became The 1st Viscount Hailsham and Lord Chancellor.

References

Ranches in Texas
1883 establishments in Texas
American companies established in 1883
American companies disestablished in 1896
1896 disestablishments in Texas
Collingsworth County, Texas
1896 mergers and acquisitions